Night Tales is a 2016 Spanish comedy film directed by Manuela Burló Moreno.

Cast 
 Pilar López de Ayala - Lucía
 Miki Esparbé - Iván
 Karra Elejalde - Pedro
 Emilio Palacios - Koke
 Christopher Torres - Luisito
 Fernando Albizu - Paco
 Carmen Machi - Lupe
 Ernesto Alterio - Alberto

References

External links 

2016 comedy films
Spanish comedy films
2010s Spanish films